The 2011–12 Hockey East women's ice hockey season  marked the continuation of the annual tradition of competitive ice hockey among Hockey East members.

Exhibition

CIS Exhibition

Regular season

News and notes

October
In her Boston University Terriers debut on September 30, 2011, Isabel Menard logged three assists against North Dakota. The following day (also against North Dakota), Menard scored her first goal as a Terrier.

November
November 3: The Vermont Catamounts won their first ever game at New Hampshire by a 4-1 tally at the Whittemore Center. Catamounts goalie Roxanne Douville made 33 saves, while freshman Amanda Pelkey notched a goal and an assist.
November 18: Minnesota skater Amanda Kessel registered 5 points as the Golden Gophers defeated the New Hampshire Wildcats by an 11-0 tally. New Hampshire starting goalie Jenn Gilligan made 27 saves but allowed eight goals in two periods. She was replaced by Moe Bradley in the third period. Bradley stopped 11 of 14 shots as the Wildcats suffered their worst loss in the 35 year history of the program.
November 26: New Hampshire Wildcats player Nicole Gifford scored the first hat trick of her career as the Wildcats defeated the Princeton Tigers by a 3-1 mark. The Wildcats improved to 38-5-2 lifetime against Princeton.

December
December 22: In recognition of the ten-year anniversary of the Women's Hockey East Association, the Friars announced their Providence Hockey East All-Decade Team. Six forwards, five defenders and two goalies were honored.

January
January 10: The Dartmouth Big Green and Providence Friars played each other in an outdoor game at Fenway Park in Boston. Providence skater Brooke Simpson scored her first career NCAA goal. With 1:14 remaining in regulation, Big Green forward Camille Dumais scored the game-winning goal on Providence netminder Genevieve Lacasse as the Big Green prevailed by a 3-2 mark.
January 22: Maine hosted Providence College for the Sixth Annual Hockey East Skating Strides Against Breast Cancer event. The Black Bears bested the Friars in an overtime finish by a 3-2 mark. Maine improved to 13-8-6 on the season and 7-6-2 in Hockey East play. Maine goals were scored by Brianne Kilgour, Brittany Dougherty and Danielle Ward. Mary Dempsey from the Patrick Dempsey Cancer Center participated in the ceremonial puck drop. Commemorative game jerseys with pink color were auctioned off after the game. In addition, the team participated in an autograph session in which all fans received a signed team photo.
January 25: Kerrin Sperry recorded her first shutout of the season as she logged 30 saves. In addition, Isabel Menard logged the 100th point of her NCAA career as the Terriers prevailed over the rival Boston College Eagles by a 6-0 tally.
January 29: The Huskies participated in the annual Hockey East Skating Strides game at the Freitas Ice Forum. Against the Providence Friars, the Huskies were defeated by a 5-2 mark. With the loss, the Huskies fell to 3-18-7 overall. The Huskies ended up being swept in the season series. In a pre-game ceremony, UConn presented Hockey East Associate Commissioner Kathy Winters with a donation of $10,000, representing the Friends of Mel Foundation. Of note, the Huskies set a program-record for funds raised in the Skating Strides event.

February
February 11: Before the match against the Eagles, Connecticut announced the Connecticut Hockey East All-Decade Team (in commemoration of Hockey East’s 10th Anniversary). The forwards named included: Jennifer Chaisson, Jaclyn Hawkins and Tiffany Owens. The honored defenders included Cristin Allen and Natalie Vibert. Kaitlyn Shain was named All-Decade goaltender.
February 17: Northeastern ended their 13 year Beanpot championship drought when Casey Pickett scored the game-winning goal in overtime past Boston University goaltender Kerrin Sperry. The Huskies prevailed by a 4-3 tally with the other Huskies goals scored by Kendall Coyne, Lucie Povova, and Sonia St. Martin. Huskies goaltender Florence Schelling made a season best 43 saves to claim her 17th win of the season.

Standings

In-season honors

Players of the week

Defensive players of the week

Rookies of the week

Team of the week

Monthly awards

Player of the month

Goaltender of the month

Rookie of the month

Hockey East tournament

Hockey East 10th Anniversary Team
On February 29, 2012, Hockey East named its 10th Anniversary Team, along with a group of Honorable Mention players.

Honorable mention

End-of-season awards
Best Defender, Kasey Boucher, BU
Gladiator Best Defensive Forward: Casey Pickett, Northeastern
Sportsmanship Award: Ashely Cottrell, PC
Turfer Athletic Award, Kelly Wallace, Northeastern
Scoring Champion, Jenn Wakefield, BU
Goaltending Champion, Florence Schelling (1.27 GAA, .956 %), Northeastern

WHEA All-Rookie Team
Forward: Alex Carpenter, BC (unanimous choice)
Forward: Kendall Coyne, Northeastern (unanimous choice)
Forward: Emily Field, BC
Forward:Amanda Pelkey, Vermont
Forward: Kayla Tutino, BU
Defense:Emily Pfalzer, BC (unanimous choice)

See also
 National Collegiate Women's Ice Hockey Championship
 2010–11 Hockey East women's ice hockey season
 2011–12 WCHA women's ice hockey season
 2011–12 ECAC women's ice hockey season
 2011–12 CHA women's ice hockey season

References

Hockey East
Hockey East